Opostegoides scioterma is a moth of the family Opostegidae. It is probably widespread across most of the northern United States and southern Canada from western Oregon, Washington and British Columbia east to Ontario and Maine.

The length of the forewings is 3.1-4.4 mm. Adults have been collected from mid-June to early August.

The larvae feed on Ribes grossularia, Ribes nigrum and Ribes sativum. They mine under the bark in the cambial cylinder of both new spring shoots and canes from the previous seasons growth. The mine is a slender, linear tunnel that normally curves at both upper and lower ends to form a narrow ellipse. When the larva completes a circle, it normally re-invades the initial mine and continues feeding and enlarging it.

After dropping to the ground, the larva eventually constructs a flattened, oval, densely woven, cream to brown cocoon in the upper soil layer. The pupal stage may last about 2–3 weeks.

External links
A Revision of the New World Plant-Mining Moths of the Family Opostegidae (Lepidoptera: Nepticuloidea)

Scioterma
Moths described in 1920